The Welsh Republican Movement was a Welsh nationalist political party.

It was founded in 1949 as a split from Plaid Cymru.  The group, some of whom had previously been members of the Labour Party, aimed to build a base in industrial southeast Wales by focusing on socialism and republicanism rather than on rural affairs, pacifism and the Welsh language.

In 1950, the group began publishing a newspaper, The Welsh Republican - Y Gweriniaethwr.  It stood Ithel Davies in Ogmore in the 1950 general election, and took 1.3% of the vote.

Some members of the party were arrested for burning the Union Jack, and it faced accusations of initiating violence.  They also conceived a Welsh republican flag, a tricolor with green, red and white bands.

By the mid-1950s, most members of the Movement had either returned to Plaid Cymru or joined the Labour Party, and its newspaper ceased publication in 1957.  However, F. W. S. Craig believed that it remained active as late as 1966.

References

Peter Barberis, John McHugh and Mike Tyldesley, Encyclopedia of British and Irish Political Organizations
Ymgyrchu! - The Welsh Republican Movement
Welsh separatist and independentist flags

See also
 English republicanism
 Irish republicanism
 Scottish republicanism
 Welsh nationalism
 Republicanism in the United Kingdom

Defunct political parties in Wales
Left-wing nationalist parties
Pacifism in the United Kingdom
Political parties established in 1949
Republican parties in the United Kingdom
Republicanism in Wales
Socialist parties in Wales
Welsh nationalist parties